Marsel İlhan was the defending champion, but he lost in quarterfinals to Konstantin Kravchuk.

Aslan Karatsev won the title, defeating Konstantin Kravchuk in the final, 6–4, 4–6, 6–3.

Seeds

Draw

Finals

Top half

Bottom half

References
 Main Draw
 Qualifying Draw

Kazan Kremlin Cup - Singles
Kazan Kremlin Cup
2015 in Russian tennis